Gălești is a commune in Mureș County, Transylvania, Romania composed of seven villages:
Adrianu Mare / Nagyadorján
Adrianu Mic / Kisadorján
Bedeni / Bede
Gălești
Maiad / Nyomát
Sânvăsii / Nyárádszentlászló (established 2004)
Troița / Szentháromság

Demographics
The commune has an absolute Székely Hungarian majority. According to the 2002 Census it has a population of 2,940 of which 93.61% or 2,752 are Hungarian.

See also
List of Hungarian exonyms (Mureș County)

References

Communes in Mureș County
Localities in Transylvania